Glamanand Supermodel India 2021 was the seventh edition of Glamanand Supermodel India contest. The event took place on August 21, 2021, at Kingdom of Dreams, in Gurugram, India. At the conclusion of the event, Simrithi Bathija crowned Zoya Afroz as the new Miss India International. At the same event, Divija Gambhir was crowned Miss India Multinational 2021 and Tanya Sinha was crowned Miss India Globe International.

Final results
Color keys

Special Awards

Judges
 Kartikeya Arora – editor in chief TMM magazine
 Maya Sagi – fashion designer
 Dr. Amit Karkhanis – Dermatologist and Founder Dr Tvacha
 Yashraj Tongia –  former director DGCA and businessman
 Rekha Vohra – social activist and holistic trainer
 Simrithi Bathija – Miss International India 2019
 Tanvi Malhara – Miss Multinational India 2019
 Dr. Varun Katyal –  nutritionist and wellness expert
 Rajiv Srivastava – founder Act Now 
 Nikhil Anand – founder/ Chairman of Glamanand

Candidates
Below is the list of candidates that competed at the competition.
•	Zoya Afroz 
•	Archana Ravi 
•	Aishwarya Dikshit
•	Naina Vijay Sharma
•	Tanya Sinha
•	Sejal Renake
•	Himani Gaikwad
•	Megha Shetty
•	Megha Julka
•	Deeksha Narang
•	Shivani Tak
•	Saachi Gurav
•	Asmita Chakraborty
•	Tanu Shree
•	Shweta Shinde
•	Hannah Tamalapakula
•	Susang Sherpa
•	Disha Shamwani
•	Isha Vaidya
•	Annu Bhati
•	Arushi Singh
•	Divija Gambhir
•	Shalini Rana
•	Anisha Sharma

References

Beauty pageants in India
2021 beauty pageants